Chene La Rochelle is a paralympic equestrian from Canada.

She competed in the 1984 Summer Paralympics, where she won two bronze medals in dressage.

References

External links 
 

Living people
Canadian female equestrians
Paralympic equestrians of Canada
Paralympic bronze medalists for Canada
Paralympic medalists in equestrian
Equestrians at the 1984 Summer Paralympics
Medalists at the 1984 Summer Paralympics
Year of birth missing (living people)